Grady W. Lewis (March 25, 1917 – March 11, 2009) was an American professional basketball player.

He played college basketball for the Southwestern Oklahoma State Bulldogs and Oklahoma Sooners. Lewis played four seasons with the Phillips 66 Oilers of the AAU, and three seasons (1946–1949) in the Basketball Association of America as a member of the Detroit Falcons, St. Louis Bombers, and Baltimore Bullets.  He averaged 5.4 points per game in his career and won a league championship with Baltimore in 1948.  Lewis also was a member of two AAU national championship teams with Phillips 66 (1940, 1946).

Lewis coached the St. Louis Bombers during the 1948–49 and 1949–50 seasons. He then worked for the Converse shoe company. Lewis went on to invent the Converse All Stars shoe, although he did not get recognition as the famous Marketer Chuck Taylor was accredited due to his popular name. Lewis was inducted into the Southwestern Oklahoma State Hall of Fame in 1970.

BAA career statistics

Regular season

Playoffs

References

External links
Career statistics

1917 births
2009 deaths
American men's basketball players
Baltimore Bullets (1944–1954) players
Basketball coaches from Texas
Basketball players from Texas
Centers (basketball)
Detroit Falcons (basketball) players
Oklahoma Sooners men's basketball players
People from Boyd, Texas
Phillips 66ers players
Player-coaches
Power forwards (basketball)
Southwestern Oklahoma State Bulldogs men's basketball players
Sportspeople from the Dallas–Fort Worth metroplex
St. Louis Bombers (NBA) coaches
St. Louis Bombers (NBA) players